José Muñoz Sánchez (5 March 1962 – 5 July 2019) was a Spanish politician who served as a Senator since 2018 until his death.

References

1962 births
2019 deaths
21st-century Spanish politicians
Members of the 12th Senate of Spain
Members of the 13th Senate of Spain
Spanish Socialist Workers' Party politicians